The 1960 Nebraska gubernatorial election was held on November 8, 1960, and featured attorney and frequent political candidate Frank B. Morrison, a Democrat, defeating Republican nominee, state Senator John R. Cooper.

Democratic primary

Candidates
Charles A. Bates
Robert B. Conrad, administrative assistant to Governor Ralph G. Brooks
Tony Mangiamelli
Frank B. Morrison, attorney and former school superintendent

Results

Republican primary

Candidates
Hazel Abel, former U.S. Senator and businesswoman
Terry Carpenter, member of the Nebraska Legislature and former U.S. Representative
John R. Cooper, member of the Nebraska Legislature
Del Lienemann, accountant
George H. Ramsey
Dwain Williams, member of the Nebraska Legislature

Results

General election

Results

References

Gubernatorial
1960
Nebraska
November 1960 events in the United States